This is a list of circuits which have hosted a round of the FIA World Touring Car Championship. This includes from the inaugural year of 1987, the WTCC held between 2005 and 2017 and the WTCR which held between 2018 and 2022.

List

References

See also
World Touring Car Championship
Touring car racing

 
WTCC